Francis Lister Hawks Pott (February 22, 1864 – March 7, 1947) was an American Episcopal missionary and educator in China. He served as President of St. John's College (later renamed St. John's University), one of China's oldest and most prestigious universities, from 1888 until 1941. With the outbreak of the Pacific War in 1941 and the Japanese occupation of the Shanghai International Settlement, he left for the United States. After World War II, he returned to Shanghai.

Pott was married to Soo Ngoo Wong, who died in 1918. Their children were James Hawks Pott, William Sumner Appleton Hawks Pott, Olivia Hawks Pott, and Walter Graham Hawks Pott.

In 1919 in Shanghai, he married Emily Georgiana née Browne, the widow of his St. John’s colleague  Frederick Clement Cooper and mother of Gwendolin and Mervyn Cooper.

Pott was educated at the Trinity School, received a bachelor's degree from Columbia College of Columbia University in 1883, and a degree in divinity General Theological Seminary in 1886.

See also

Christianity in China

Bibliography

Pott, F. L. Hawks (Francis Lister Hawks), 1864-1947
Sketch of Chinese history [microform] 
 
 
 
The Outbreak in China: Its Causes. (New York: James Pott and Co., 1900)
 A Sketch of Chinese History (New York: Domestic and Foreign Missionary Society, 1913)
  The Emergency in China (New York: Missionary Education Movement of the United States and Canada, 1913)
A Short History of Shanghai: Being an Account of the Growth and Development of the International Settlement (Kelly and Walsh, Limited, 1928)

References

External links
 

Anglican missionaries in China
1864 births
1947 deaths
Educators from New York (state)
American Anglican missionaries
Missionary educators
American expatriates in China
Academic staff of St. John's University, Shanghai
Trinity School (New York City) alumni
Columbia College (New York) alumni
General Theological Seminary alumni